Historia de una noche de niebla is a 1950 Argentine film. It was directed by José María Blanco Felis and written by Cecilio Benítez de Castro.

Cast

References

External links
 

1950 films
1950s Spanish-language films
Argentine black-and-white films
Argentine drama films
1950 drama films
1950s Argentine films